Big Talk is a song by American glam metal band Warrant. It was released in 1989 as the third single from Warrant's debut album Dirty Rotten Filthy Stinking Rich. The song charted at #30 on the Mainstream Rock Tracks chart and #93 on the Billboard Hot 100.

Music video
The music video features the album cover character--calling himself "Cashly Guido Bucksley", an overpaid, amoral infrastructure manager and archetypal business psychopath who is watching Warrant in concert. The video begins with a meeting with the corrupt music executive before the band are locked in a cage and Jani Lane is strapped in an electric chair. The character also features through out the video album "'Warrant: Live - Dirty Rotten Filthy Stinking Rich" which was certified Platinum.

Tracklisting

Charts

References

1989 singles
Warrant (American band) songs
Songs written by Jani Lane
1989 songs
Columbia Records singles